Kairo may refer to:

 Kairo (band), Mexican boy band from 1993 to 1999 with Eduardo Verástegui as member until 1996
 Kairo (video game), independently published exploration video game made by Richard Perrin
 Kairo (film), A.K.A. Pulse, a 2001 Japanese film directed by Kiyoshi Kurosawa
 Kairo-kō, a 1905 novel by Japanese author Natsume Sōseki
 Kai-ro, a superhero in episodes of Batman Beyond and Justice League Unlimited cartoons (a future Green Lantern), named after Green Lantern's alien sidekick Kairo.
Kairō, a cloister-like part of a Japanese Buddhist temple
 Kairo is also a Japanese term for a hand warmer
 Kairo block, a community development block in Jharkhand, India
 Kairo, Lohardaga, a village in Jharkhand, India

See also
 Kairos (disambiguation)
 Cairo (disambiguation)